The Reno–Sparks Metropolitan Statistical Area, as defined by the United States Census Bureau, is an area consisting of two counties in Western Nevada, anchored by the cities of Reno and Sparks, part of Greater Reno-Tahoe-Fernley CSA. As of the 2020 census, the MSA had a population of 490,596.

Counties
 Storey
 Washoe

Communities

Cities
 Reno (Principal city)
 Sparks

Census-designated places
Note: All census-designated places are unincorporated.
 Cold Springs
 Crystal Bay
 Empire
 Gerlach
 Golden Valley
 Incline Village
 Lemmon Valley
 Mogul
 Nixon
 Spanish Springs
 Sun Valley
 Sutcliffe
 Verdi
 Virginia City
 Wadsworth

Unincorporated places
 Gold Hill
 New Washoe City
 Pleasant Valley
 Poeville
 Pyramid
 Vya

Demographics
As of the census of 2010, there were 425,417 people, 165,187 households, and 103,909 families residing within the MSA. The racial makeup of the MSA was 77.0% White, 2.3% African American, 1.7% Native American, 5.1% Asian, 0.6% Pacific Islander, 9.4% some other race, and 3.8% from two or more races. Hispanic or Latino of any race were 22.1% of the population.

In 2011, the estimated median income for a household in the MSA was $50,768, and the median income for a family was $60,605. Males had a median income of $44,883 versus $35,560 for females. The per capita income for the MSA was $27,500.

Combined Statistical Area
The Reno–Tahoe–Fernley Combined Statistical Area (CSA) is made up of four counties and one independent city, Carson City. The statistical area includes two metropolitan areas and two micropolitan areas. As of the 2010 Census, the CSA had a population of 579,668.

Components
 Metropolitan Statistical Areas (MSAs)
  Reno (Washoe and Storey counties)
  Carson City (independent city)
 Micropolitan Statistical Areas (μSAs)
  Fernley (Lyon County)
  Gardnerville Ranchos (Douglas County)
  Storey County

See also

 Nevada census statistical areas
 Reno (Nevada gaming area)

References

 
Populated places in Washoe County, Nevada
Populated places in Storey County, Nevada
Metropolitan areas of Nevada